William Horace "Bingo" Bingham (born April 16, 1885) was a Negro leagues outfielder for several years before the founding of the first Negro National League, and in its first couple seasons.

References

External links
 and Baseball-Reference Black Baseball stats and Seamheads 

Negro league baseball managers
1885 births
Year of death missing
Birmingham Giants players
Chicago Giants players
French Lick Plutos players
Leland Giants players
West Baden Sprudels players